is the 33rd single by the Japanese J-pop group Every Little Thing, released on August 8, 2007.

Track listing
  (Words - Kaori Mochida / music - Kunio Tago)
  (Words - Kaori Mochida / music - Kazunori Watanabe)

Chart positions

External links
  information at Avex Network.

2007 singles
Every Little Thing (band) songs
Songs written by Kaori Mochida
2007 songs
Avex Trax singles